Taylors Point is a locality and point in Clareville, a suburb of Sydney, Australia, situated on the Northern Beaches. It was named after John Taylor, who was an early owner of property on Taylors Point.

References

Sydney localities